Lloyd in Space is an American animated television series, created by Recess co-creators Joe Ansolabehere and Paul Germain. It premiered on February 3, 2001, on ABC on Saturday mornings. The pilot was written by Ansolabehere, Germain and Mark Drop, with the characters designed by Eric Keyes. The series ran for four seasons, airing its final episode on February 27, 2004. As of March 15, 2023, the series is not available on Disney+ and has never been digitally released.

Premise
Living far in the future, shortly after the end of World War IX, Lloyd Nebulon is a green-skinned alien of the Verdigrean race with pointy ears and a single antenna sticking from his head. Lloyd lives in the Intrepidville Space Station along with his telekinetic and telepathic little sister Francine and his mother, Commander Norah Li Nebulon, the Head of Intrepidville. Lloyd's friends are Eddie R. Horton (a red-haired teenage human), Kurt Blobberts (a massive purple blob with a single eyeball and low intelligence, of a species known as the Blobullons), and Douglas McNoggin (a giant brain with limbs and a face, of a species known as the Cerebellians).

Episodes

Characters

Main  
 Lloyd P. Nebulon (voiced by Courtland Mead) is a normal 13-year-old boy of the Verdigrean species. Though he is a kind and easygoing teenager and despite his mother's leadership over Intrepidville, he and his group are considered the "dorks" of their class at Luna Vista Middle School. Such instances involve or result in the constant bullying and mistreatment at the hands of their classmates, especially ones of the more socially-popular circle. Lloyd has a crush on his classmate Brittany Boviak, the respected yet snobbish head cheerleader who (despite often verbally and emotionally harassing Lloyd) secretly reciprocates his feelings. 
 Commander Nora Li Nebulon (voiced by April Winchell) is the commander of Intrepidville and Lloyd and Francine's single mother. She is authoritarian, patient, caring and supportive. Lloyd and Francine's father never appeared in the series.
 Francine Nebulon (voiced by Nicolette Little) is Lloyd's little sister. She loves her doll Rosie, and loves to use her telekinesis and telepathy. Her favorite TV show is The Daisy Droid Girls (a parody of The Powerpuff Girls).
 Station (voiced by Brian George) is the space station's computer. When activated, he assumes the form of an eyeball attached to a long wire leading from any computer terminal. Station has a tendency to be neurotic and dismissive to those around him.
 Edward R. "Eddie" Horton (voiced by Justin Shenkarow) is Lloyd's human best friend. He has wavy orange hair and tries to act in a "cool" manner. His father is a police officer.  
 Douglas McNoggin (voiced by Pamela Hayden) is a member of the Cerebellian species who resembles a brain with glasses, arms, and legs and one of Lloyd's friends. While he is the most intelligent character in the show, he is the least athletic.
 Kurt Blobberts (voiced by Bill Fagerbakke) is Lloyd's large, one-eyed friend of the Blobullon species. While sometimes slow-witted, Kurt is a kind and loving character, but is usually treated the same as the rest of his group of friends. His head can be removed from his body and still function.

Villains 
 The Zeptar's Bandit (voiced by Danny Cooksey) is a lowly criminal. He robs Zeptar's (a local eatery) before he is caught by the police.
 Frontok (voiced by Kevin Michael Richardson) is the captain of a fleet of space pirates who hold Lloyd and his friends hostage. He is eventually thwarted by Commander Nebulon, Lloyd's mother.
 The Pick-pocket is a criminal that appears in Eddie's memory in the final episode of the show. He is caught by Eddie's dad.
 Kurtlas is the fusion between Douglas and Kurt due to Lloyd's suggestion. At first Kurtlas defends the weaker and smaller kids at school from Rodney and the other bullies but all this fame goes to his head and becomes the school bully himself. He is stopped by Lloyd in the end.
 The Preditalien is a monster which attacks and infects Intrepidville from the year X27 to X37. If one scratched or bit another life form they too would become monsters. In the episode the preditalien appears, it is merely an illusion created by Francine to scare Lloyd and his friends, provided by Boomer's comics.

Supporting 
 Dunkirque (voiced by Dan Castellaneta) is second-in-command of the space station. He is a tough and obedient prominent aide to Commander Nebulon.
 Larry (voiced by Eddie Deezen) is the other one of Commander Nebulon's prominent aides. He is a purple humanoid who frequently acts childishly.
 Boomer (voiced by Diedrich Bader) is the mechanic who repairs all the spacecraft on Intrepidville. He is fairly simple-minded. It is revealed in "Boomer's Secret Life" that he is the heir to his race's throne, but he turned his title over to his brother Sleeveknot.
 Lou 2000 (voiced by John DiMaggio) is Station's bad-mouthed backup system. When in use, he frequently picks on Larry.
 Brittany Boviak (voiced by Anndi McAfee) is a wealthy, popular six-armed Tsktskian girl who is the captain of the cheerleading squad. She is also revealed later in the series to have a secret crush on Lloyd. Although she secretly likes Lloyd, she verbally and emotionally abuses him, giving the impression that he is not worthy of her time.
 Megan Uno (voiced by Rachel Crane) is Brittany's best friend with a single eyestalk. She is usually with Brittany wherever she goes, and most of the time she is slightly more sour than Brittany herself and surprisingly more shallow in terms of boys.
 Cindy is a girl with two heads: One head is friendly, empathetic, and mature, and the other head tends to be rude, offensive, and grouchy. Cindy is one of the few recurring students to be a friend to Lloyd's group. Her good head is voiced by Tara Strong, while her bad head is voiced by Mayim Bialik.
 Eileen (voiced by Michelle Horn) is a girl who has three eyes and four tentacles on the lower half of her body instead of arms and legs.
 Rodney Glaxer (voiced by Warren Sroka) is the four-armed school bully who is also the quarterback of the Luna Vista crushball team. He favors picking on nerds, particularly Mendel, though he has no general qualm or limit when it comes to making trouble for those who are smaller, weaker, or even lack the confidence to confront him. Towards the end of the series, Rodney is revealed to be the reason for Lloyd's low standing in the popularity social scale, as he tripped Lloyd in 1st grade when he was a new student, causing him to stumble and fall on Brittany's finger-painted picture getting him laughed at by the rest of class and resulting in Brittany's perceived hatred of him in the future.
 Mendel (voiced by Blake McIver Ewing) is one of the nerds at Luna Vista and the main target of Rodney's bullying. He often hangs out with his nerd friends such as Lou and Benny, as well as other unpopular kids.
 Mrs. Barbara Bolt (voiced by Tress MacNeille) is Lloyd's teacher at Luna Vista Middle School. She is a cranky robot who gets very angry when Lloyd or any other student is messing around.
 Mr. Stinko (voiced by Kevin Michael Richardson) is the garbage man of Intrepidville.
 Charmaine is a female Cerebellian. She is seen as a very intelligent character, and often is involved in debates against other schools, often with partner Douglas. She is friends with Douglas, Cindy and Missy.
 Missy is a Blobullon who resembles Kurt in many ways, she has one eye and purple skin. However, she is slightly smaller than Kurt. She and Kurt seem to like each other as shown in "Double Date," he compliments her saying she is "neat." She is friends with Cindy, Charmaine and Kurt.
 Leo Andromedos (voiced by Brian Doyle-Murray) is the grandfather of Lloyd and Francine and the father of Nora. He is a father figure to Lloyd.
 Jake is one of Rodney's friends. Jake, like Rodney, is also a bully and one of the Crater Worm jocks on the school's crushball team.
 Marcus Xenon is another one of Rodney's friends who is also a bully. Marcus, like Eileen, is a green, three-eyed, octopus-like alien, only without hair and having a more frequent tendency to moving bipedal.
 Violet (voiced by Ashley Johnson) is a girl who is friends with Brittany and Megan. Violet tends to be more shy than the other girls of her class and she even reveals in the season 2 finale that she has a crush on Lloyd, though this was never mentioned again afterwards. According to this same episode, she is president of the school yearbook staff.

Production
Lloyd in Space was first introduced in early 2001 during Disney's One Saturday Morning on ABC. The show received higher ratings than initially expected, prompting Disney to quickly order additional episodes (some of which would air in the second season).

Lloyd in Space finished production in 2003, after the One Saturday Morning block was removed. The final episodes aired in February 2004.

Broadcast
Reruns of the series aired on Toon Disney until 2006, when it was replaced by The Emperor's New School.

Reception 

The series received a mixed reception. Andrea Graham of Common Sense Media described the series as focusing on "space teen [who] copes with intergalactic boredom." She also argued that the series is "charming and heartwarming".

References

External links 
 
 

2000s American animated television series
2001 American television series debuts
2004 American television series endings
ABC Kids (TV programming block)
Toon Disney original programming
American children's animated comic science fiction television series
American children's animated space adventure television series
Animated television series about extraterrestrial life
English-language television shows
Television series by Disney Television Animation
Television series about colonialism
Television series about outer space
Television series created by Paul Germain
Television series set on fictional planets